Bruce Robert Baumgartner (born November 2, 1960) is a retired American freestyle wrestler. He is the current assistant vice president for university advancement and former athletic director at the Edinboro University of Pennsylvania near Erie, Pennsylvania and current President of USA Wrestling.

Baumgartner is among the best American wrestlers of all time. Amongst American wrestlers, his five international titles is only behind Jordan Burroughs, John Smith, and Adeline Gray. Between 1983 and 1996, Baumgartner won 13 World or Olympic medals, the most World and Olympic medals among American wrestlers.

Life and career
Baumgartner was born in Haledon, New Jersey. He is one of the most accomplished American wrestlers of all time, winning 4 Olympic Medals (2-Gold, 1-Silver, 1-Bronze), 9 World Championship Medals (3-Gold, 3-Silver, 3-Bronze) and 4 Pan-American Medals (3-Gold, 1-Silver,); he has also won 12 World Cup Medals (7-Gold, 5-Silver), an NCAA title (and 2 Runner-Up finishes), 4 Olympic Festival titles, 2 AAU National titles and a Junior National title.

During high school, Baumgartner excelled on the wrestling team, going 23–0, but was defeated in the NJ State Championship match. During the off-season he threw shot put and discus on the track team, setting several records in the shot put. Baumgartner is a four-time Olympian and owns four Olympic Medals: two gold, one silver and one bronze. He holds a Bachelor's degree in education from Indiana State University in Terre Haute, IN where he competed collegiately for 4 years. He frequently worked out alongside Kurt Thomas, the Olympic Gymnast. During his collegiate career he finished runner-up at Nationals his sophomore and junior years, and was the 1982 NCAA National Champion his senior year completing an undefeated season of 44–0. His collegiate record was 134–12 with 73 falls. In 1995, he was presented the James E. Sullivan Award by the Amateur Athletic Union as the outstanding amateur athlete in the U.S. He was sponsored through the New York Athletic Club. Baumgartner attended Manchester Regional High School in Haledon, New Jersey.

Baumgartner ranked as one of the top super-heavyweight freestyle wrestlers for more than a decade. Winning his first World Championship medal, a bronze, in 1983; he won the World Championship in Los Angeles. He confirmed his status with the Communist Bloc (Eastern European) wrestlers by winning in 1986, clinching his first of his three world titles.

In his second Olympic final in Seoul, he took silver, behind Georgian David Gobejishvili. Four years later, in 1992, he won the rematch in Barcelona, en route to a second Olympic gold. After winning world titles in 1993 and 1995, Baumgartner was favored to win his third gold in Atlanta, but a loss to Russian Andrey Shumilin left him with a bronze medal.

Championships
In addition to his World (3) and Olympic titles (2), Baumgartner amassed three golds at the Pan American Games, 17 American titles and eight World Cup wins.  An NCAA National Championship, 2, NCAA Runner-Up finishes, 2 AAU National Titles and a Junior National title.

In 1998, Baumgartner was inducted into the Indiana State University Athletic Hall of Fame; in 2003, the Missouri Valley Conference named him an 'Institutional Great' and inducted him into the Missouri Valley Conference Hall of Fame.  In 2008, Baumgartner was inducted into the U.S. Olympic Hall of Fame. He was inducted into the National Wrestling Hall of Fame as a Distinguished Member in 2002 and the International Wrestling Federation Hall of Fame (FILA) in 2003.

See also
List of multiple Summer Olympic medalists

References

External links
 
 
 
 
 
 

1960 births
Living people
Edinboro Fighting Scots athletic directors
Indiana State Sycamores wrestlers
American male sport wrestlers
Wrestlers at the 1984 Summer Olympics
Wrestlers at the 1988 Summer Olympics
Wrestlers at the 1992 Summer Olympics
Wrestlers at the 1996 Summer Olympics
Olympic gold medalists for the United States in wrestling
Olympic silver medalists for the United States in wrestling
Olympic bronze medalists for the United States in wrestling
People from Haledon, New Jersey
World Wrestling Championships medalists
Medalists at the 1996 Summer Olympics
Medalists at the 1992 Summer Olympics
Medalists at the 1988 Summer Olympics
Medalists at the 1984 Summer Olympics
Pan American Games gold medalists for the United States
Pan American Games silver medalists for the United States
Pan American Games medalists in wrestling
Universiade medalists in wrestling
Sportspeople from Erie, Pennsylvania
Wrestlers at the 1983 Pan American Games
Wrestlers at the 1987 Pan American Games
Wrestlers at the 1991 Pan American Games
Wrestlers at the 1995 Pan American Games
Universiade gold medalists for the United States
Goodwill Games medalists in wrestling
Medalists at the 1981 Summer Universiade
Competitors at the 1986 Goodwill Games
Medalists at the 1991 Pan American Games